Chlorocardium venenosum is a species of trees in the family Lauraceae. It is native to South America.

References

Lauraceae
Trees of Peru